The 100 best films in the history of Ukrainian cinema is a rating given from 1 - 100 to the best films in Ukrainian cinema. The films were selected in June 2021 by the National Oleksandr Dovzhenko Film Centre in Kyiv, Ukraine through a poll taken of representatives of the national and international film community.

List

References

Sources 
 TOP 100. Rating of the best films in the history of Ukrainian cinema

Lists of films
Top film lists
Lists of Ukrainian films